Warren Felt Evans (December 23, 1817 – September 4, 1889) was an American author of the New Thought movement. It has been traditionally thought that he became a student of the movement in 1863, after seeking healing from its founder, Phineas Parkhurst Quimby, but recent scholarship by Catherine Albanese, editor of  The Spiritual Journals of Warren Felt Evans from Methodism to Mind Cure, pp. 7-9, puts that in serious doubt—based on interviews that Evans gave, his own printed statements, and his personal journal during this period which never mentioned Quimby. For example in an interview with A. J. Swarts in Mental Science Magazine (March, 1888), Albanese reported, Evans "called twice briefly on Dr. Q. in Portland nearly twenty-five years ago, and his interviews satisfied him that his own methods of cure were like those which Dr. Q employed." Swarts added that Evans spoke "well of him [Quimby], and of all the workers, simply desiring all to be honest and to 'give credit where credit is due.’" 

Swarts reported in the same issue: “He told me recently that he was passing through Portland near twenty-five years ago; that he called upon Dr. Quimby in the United States Hotel  to ascertain his methods of treatment, and that he found them to be like those he had employed for several years, which was a mental process of changing the patient’s way of thinking about disease. He said that Dr. Quimby would manipulate the head sometimes.”

Evans in his book (1869) The Mental-Cure, p. iv, made clear his view of lack of antecedents or mentors: ““The author had but little in works on mental and psychological science to guide him in his investigations, but was under the necessity of following the light of his own researches, experiments, and intuitions.”

This compares to what Julius Dresser said in The True History of Mental Science (1887), looking back eleven years:

“Dr. Evans obtained this knowledge of Quimby mainly when he visited him as a patient, making two visits for that purpose, about the year 1863, an interesting account of which I received from him, at East Salisbury, in the year 1876. Dr. Evans had been a clergyman up to the year 1863, and was then located in Claremont, N. H. But so readily did he understand the explanations of Quimby, which his Swedenborgian faith enabled him to grasp the more quickly, that he told Quimby at the second interview that he thought he could himself cure the sick in this way. Quimby replied that he thought he could. His first attempts on returning home were so successful that the preacher became a practitioner from that time, and the result has been great growth in the truth and the accomplishment of a great and a good work during the nearly twenty-five years since then. Dr. Evans's six volumes upon the subject of Mental Healing have had a wide and a well-deserved sale.”

Evans looked back to about the year 1860 when he wrote this in his article “The Mental-Cure” in the periodical The Mind Cure and the Science of Life (May, 1885):

“The system of mental healing which is now exciting so much interest in the public mind is not a new system, but under other names has been practiced from the remotest ages. . . .This is not a new revelation, but is the old philosophic idealism, the most ancient and the most spiritual philosophy of mankind. The best exposition of this philosophy in modern times is found in the works of such men as Bishop Berkeley, and the German idealists,, as Fichte, Hegel, and Schopenhauer. But the fundamental truths and practical principles involved in the cure of ourselves or others by the phrenopathic method are extremely simple, and can be learned in a short time. . . . During the last twenty-five years I have taught all that is of any practical value in the systems to hundreds of persons, without money and without price.”

In comparison it was to about 1861 that he looked when he wrote in his 1886 book Esoteric Christianity (Preface dated March 7, 1886), p. 114:

“During the last quarter of a century, by an application of this principal, I have wrought many “miracles” (in the popular estimation), and a large proportion of the marvels of healing, witnessed at the present time, are illustrations of the principle we are discussing in this article.”

He was the founder of a mind-cure sanitarium in Salisbury, Massachusetts, and has been referred to as "the recording angel of metaphysics".

Personal life 
Born in Rockingham, Vermont, Evans was sixth of seven children. After studying at Chester Academy he entered Middlebury College in 1837, transferring the next year to Dartmouth College. He left in the middle of his junior year for financial reasons. He married M. Charlotte Tinker two years afterwards in 1840. Evans died on September 4, 1889.

Career 

Evans became a Methodist minister in 1838, serving eleven different charges until 1863. That year he left the Methodists and joined the Church of the New Jerusalem after reading the books of Emanuel Swedenborg. About 1840, if not earlier, Evans became a convert to the idealism of Irish philosopher, Bishop George Berkeley (1685-1753), interestingly due to an attack upon Berkeley’s philosophy by Thomas Reid (1710-1796), Scottish philosopher from Glasgow who represented the philosophical “Scottish School” of “common sense” realism. This challenge by Reid took place long before Evans was born, and it is likely that he learned of it during his college years. In his book, Divine Law of Cure (1881), p. 154, he wrote: “Reid’s attempt to refute Berkeley made me a convert to idealism more than two score years ago.”

Beyond philosophical beliefs, Evans wrote on April 12, 1860, in his journal of his view of the Christian faith as a healer and the impact of the human mind on disease: “The Lord is my strength. He is the health of my countenance and my God. I will find in Christ all that I need. He can cure every form of mental disease, and thus restore the body; for disease originates generally, if not always, in mind. I lay hold of Jesus as my life & salvation.” (Albanese, p. 155).

Evans opened a mental medicine office in Claremont, New Hampshire. He and his wife later opened an office in Boston. They practiced and informally taught the principles of mental healing there for 20 years.

Charles S. Braden, a metaphysical historian, wrote that Evans, "was the only important figure, aside from Mrs. Eddy, who attempted to work out a consistent and philosophically supported system of metaphysical healing and mental healing after Quimby."

Writing 

Evans was the first to write about the New Thought movement begun by Quimby. His first major book on the matter was published three years after Quimby died, and he continued writing for the rest of his life. (While The Mental-Cure is generally considered to be the first book on mental healing by Evans, he actually wrote against that belief in 1884 in the Preface to his book, The Primitive Mind-Cure:  “This volume is designed to contribute something toward supplying the demand in the public for further light on the subject upon which it treats,—the cure of disease in ourselves and others by mental and spiritual agencies. The first work of the author having a relation to the subject, was published over twenty-two years ago. It was followed, at intervals of different length, by four other volumes, which have had an extensive circulation in every part of the country, and to some extent Europe.” The book he was referring to from twenty-two years earlier was The Celestial Dawn.)

 (1869) The Mental Cure (Illustrating the Influence of the Mind on the Body, Both in Health and Disease, and the Psychological Method of Treatment).
 (1872) Mental Medicine. 
 (1876) Soul and Body.
 (1881) The Divine Law of Cure. 
 (1885) The Primitive Mind Cure.
 (1886) Esoteric Christianity and Mental Therapeutics.

There is an Evans manuscript in the National Library of Medicine consisting of handwritten text over two bound notebooks, dated about 1883.

Earlier books by Evans were
(1860) The Happy Islands; or, Paradise Restored
(1860) Divine Order in the Process of Full Salvation
(1862) The Celestial Dawn; or Connection of Earth and Heaven
(1864) The New Age and Its Messenger

The journals of Evans, now at Dartmouth College, were transcribed and printed in 2016 by Catherine Albanese.

References

Further reading

Charles Samuel Braden. (1963). Warren Felt Evans, Pioneer Writer. In Spirits in Rebellion: The Rise and Development of New Thought. Southern Methodist University Press. 
Catherine Albanese, editor (2016), The Spiritual Journals of Warren Felt Evans from Methodism to Mind Cure. Indiana University Press.

1817 births
1889 deaths
19th-century Christian mystics
American spiritual writers
American Swedenborgians
New Thought mystics
New Thought writers
People from Rockingham, Vermont